The siege of Gibraltar of 1727 (thirteenth siege of Gibraltar, second by Spain) saw Spanish forces besiege the British garrison of Gibraltar as part of the Anglo-Spanish War. Depending on the sources, Spanish troops numbered between 12,000 and 25,000. British defenders were 1,500 at the beginning of the siege, increasing up to about 5,000. After a five-month siege with several unsuccessful and costly assaults, Spanish troops gave up and withdrew. Following the failure the war drew to a close, opening the way for the 1728 Treaty of El Pardo and the Treaty of Seville signed in 1729.

Background
On 1 January 1727 (N.S.) the Marquis of Pozobueno, Spanish ambassador to the Court of St. James's, sent a letter to the Duke of Newcastle explaining why the Spanish Crown believed that Article X of the Treaty of Utrecht (the Article which granted Britain perpetual control of Gibraltar under certain conditions) had been nullified by infractions by the British:

The letter was tantamount to a declaration of war. Spain, however, was not in a particularly advantageous position to capture Gibraltar in 1727. At the last attempt to retake Gibraltar in 1704, Spain had a strong navy and the additional assistance of French warships. However, following their defeat at the battle of Cape Passaro and the capture of Vigo and Pasajes, the Spanish Navy was severely weakened. The Royal Navy had complete naval supremacy in the Straits, ruling out a Spanish landing in the south, and ensuring that the British garrison would be well supplied through a siege. Also, any attempt to scale the Rock from the east (as five hundred men under Colonel Figueroa, led by a local goatherd named Susarte, had done in 1704) was now impossible as the British had destroyed the path. The only option of attack open to the Spanish was along a narrow funnel (reduced in width by an inundation) that ran between the sea and the western side of the North Face of the Rock. This narrow strip of land would come under fire from three sides: Willis's battery to the east, the Grand Battery to the south, and the Devil's Tongue Battery on the Old Mole to the west.

A number of Philip V's senior military advisers warned the King that the recapture of Gibraltar was, at the present, near impossible. The Marquis of Villadarias (who had led the previous attempt to capture Gibraltar in 1704) had warned that it would be impossible to take the Rock without naval support. The senior Flemish engineer, George Prosper Verboom, agreed with this opinion, and 'gave it as his considered opinion that the only plan with any possibility of success was of a seaborne attack from the south.' However, the King was impressed by the Count de las Torres de Alcorrín, Viceroy of Navarre, who vowed that he could: 'in six weeks deliver Spain from this noxious settlement of foreigners and heretics'. The disagreement between Verboom and de las Torres was to continue throughout the siege, indeed, so noticeably that later, when the siege was underway, a diarist within Gibraltar (the anonymous 'S.H.') wrote that a Spanish deserter had reported: 'that a dispute hath happen'd betwixt two Generals about storming us, upon which the one... is going to Madrid to complain to the King."

Opposing forces

Despite Verboom's doubts, the King gave de las Torres leave to attempt an assault on Gibraltar. The count began to muster the besieging troops at San Roque at the start of 1727, in total thirty infantry battalions, six squadrons of horse, seventy-two mortars, and ninety-two guns (although on occasion some heavier guns were brought from Cadiz). Large parts of the army were not themselves Spanish. Of the thirty infantry battalions nineteen were foreign mercenaries: three battalions of Walloons, three French Belgian, four Irish, two Savoyard, two Neapolitan, one Swiss, one Corsican, and one Sicilian. Serving alongside the Jacobite Irish was the infamous Duke of Wharton. A notorious libertine, alcoholic, and founder of the original Hellfire Club, Wharton had fled England (to escape his creditors following the South Sea Bubble stock market crash) and joined the cause of the Old Pretender. He attained permission from Philip V to serve as volunteer aide-de-camp to the Count de las Torres, and was something of an embarrassment to both sides. 'The Duke of Wharton never comes into the trenches but when he is Drunk, and that then, and only then, he is mightily valiant.' He was to be badly injured in the leg during the siege and he was later declared an outlaw by the British Government.

Both the Governor of Gibraltar (the Earl of Portmore) and the Lieutenant Governor (Brigadier Jasper Clayton) were in England when the Spanish began to amass their forces. Colonel Richard Kane, the British commander of Menorca, was in temporary command of the sparsely defended British garrison of approximately 1,200 men from the 5th Regiment (Pearce's, or the Northumberland Fusiliers – later the Royal Regiment of Fusiliers), the 13th (Lord Mark Kerr's, or the Somerset Light Infantry- later the Light Infantry), the 20th (Egerton's, or the Lancashire Fusiliers – later the Royal Regiment of Fusiliers), and the 30th (Bisset's, or the East Lancashire Regiment). Kane expelled the 400 Spanish residents of Gibraltar and continued to improve the defences until 13 February (NS) when Brigadier Clayton arrived with a fleet under Admiral Sir Charles Wager and reinforcements from the 26th Regiment (Antruther's, or the Cameronians), the 29th (Disney's, or the Worcester Regiment – later known as the Worcester and Foresters Regiment), and the 39th (Newton's, or the Dorset Regiment – later the Devon and Dorset Regiment).

By early February, Spanish labourers had moved down from San Roque to the isthmus and started to construct battle lines. On 22 February (NS) a warning shot was fired over the heads of the working parties. 'The Governor gave them a Gun, at Four O'Clock, by way of Challenge, and, in an hour, Canonaded them very warmly.' Thus the thirteenth siege began.

Gibraltar under siege

The early siege

The Count de las Torres's first move was, by cover of night, to move five battalions and 1,000 working men forward to take the Devil's Tower and two other abandoned fortifications, and to dig trenches parallel to Gibraltar's walls. Until the invention of the Koehler Gun in the Great Siege (1779–1783), fixed artillery guns could not be depressed below the horizontal, so the Spanish working parties could not be fired upon from the North Face of the Rock. The finished trenches might have provided the attackers with a good foothold from which to assault the town. However, 'Admiral Wager moved his squadron out of the bay to the eastern side of the isthmus, and at point-blank range, yet beyond the reach of the Spanish guns, pounded the men with enfilade fire for three days, inflicting on them perhaps more than 1,000 casualties.' The Spaniards soon built batteries to drive away Wager's ships, but even without naval bombardment the strong winds and heavy rain of February made digging and maintaining the trenches nearly impossible.

Willis's battery, on the North Face of the Rock, gave the Spaniards a great deal of trouble. After a natural cave was discovered in the Rock, a plan was hatched to mine under Willis's Battery and 'excavate a gallery 1.5 metres wide and 1.7 high to a depth of about 25 metres, then a further 20 upwards, and to fill the cavity with 400 barrels of powder.' This activity was noticed by and alarmed the defenders:

However, the limestone under Willis's battery was far too solid to mine easily 'in less than the space of eight or ten months and a hazard whether it could be perfected even then or not.'

First heavy bombardment

Failing to create a strong stepping stone for a land assault, and lacking the means for an assault from the sea, de las Torres's only option now was to pound the British into surrender. On 24 March (NS) the Spanish began what they hoped would be a decisive bombardment:

Another contemporary account acknowledged that from this point 'it might rightly be said that ours was a gunner's war. We could do nothing but receive the enemy's fire and return it.' The Spaniards did great damage to the northern part of the town, the affluent Villa Vieja, and 'a hundred houses were by that means laid in rubbish.' After the siege the ruins were removed to create present-day Casemates. Despite the structural damage there were few casualties. The greater concern was the number of men the British had available to man the guns, repair the damage to the fortifications, and serve on sentry duty. This proved to be a major problem for the garrison.

The Spanish bombardment continued for ten days. In his entry for 24 March (O.S.) 'S.H.' noted: 'last three Days very heavy rains and some Wind.' The terrible weather caused great problems for the besiegers in the trenches beneath the rock, and the Spanish had to ease their bombardment. A Spanish official journal published in Madrid in 1727 highlights the problems the besiegers were suffering and their frustrations:

Reinforcements arrive
During this relative lull in the Spanish bombardment, much needed reinforcements arrived in Gibraltar. On 7 April (N.S.) the 25th (Middleton's, or the King's Own Scottish Borderers) and 34th (Haye's, or the Border Regiment – later the Royal Border Regiment) Regiments arrived with a 480-strong detachment from Menorca. Then on 1 May (NS) the Governor, the Earl of Portmore, arrived with ten companies of the First Guards and the 14th Regiment (Clayton's, or the West Yorkshire Regiment – later the Duke of Wellington's Regiment). Room was made for the new reinforcements by moving troops south. 'Tents were fix'd toward Europa Point and three Regiments encamped to make room in the Town for Middleton and Hayes's who disembarked this day.' Camp Bay derives its name from this siege, when a regiment was encamped above it. 1727 also saw the destruction of the trees which grew on the Rock:

One of the few sorties of the siege occurred just before the arrival of Lord Portmore. An ingenious plan devised by Clayton, it failed due to the gunners acting too soon:

Second heavy bombardment
By 7 May (N.S.) de las Torres was ready to launch another heavy bombardment. This caused major damage to the town and batteries, and caused far more British casualties than any earlier point in the siege. S.H. recorded in his journal:

The damage done to the fortifications in one day could be immense:

The recently arrived British reinforcements, however, allowed the garrison to maintain the batteries, re-mount the guns, and return fire. Lord Portmore, in an attempt to boost the morale and productivity of his infantry turned labourers, increased their pay from eight pence to a shilling a day. On 15 May (N.S.), de las Torres, trying to make a point, sent:

Nevertheless, the firing from the Spanish guns began to slacken. After several days' continuous fire the Spanish iron cannon began to burst, whilst the better brass cannon began to drop at the muzzle from overheating. The besiegers were also beginning to suffer from a lack of supplies owing to the poor Andalusian roads. 'Another deserter confirms their being in a miserable state of Health, with great want of Water and Provisions.' The garrison, on the other hand, had ample supplies of provisions, guns, and powder from the sea, and soon began to outgun the Spaniards. The Spanish continued to fire upon Gibraltar, but 'S.H.' wrote: 'We laugh at them for Fools to throw away their Powder Ball and Shells, since they neither fright, kill or hurt us.'

End of hostilities
Frustrated with the Count de las Torres's obstinacy and inability to take his advice, the Spanish senior engineer, Veerboom, had left for Madrid. His proposed overland attack from the north failing, de las Torres asked his remaining engineers (Francisco Monteagut and Diego Bordick) for their opinion. Their response was blunt:

On 23 June (N.S.) the Spanish offered a truce.

The next day a Colonel from the garrison crossed to San Roque, where a truce was agreed. The Spaniards were to remain encamped outside Gibraltar, but hostilities were to cease. An uneasy truce remained until the end of the Anglo-Spanish War in 1729.

Conditions within Gibraltar

In his journal of the siege, the anonymous 'S.H.' painted an interesting portrait of life during the siege. Although life in the garrison was often dangerous and brutish, 'S.H.' nevertheless noted how civilised, in some aspects, eighteenth century warfare could be:

However, he also chronicled (if sometimes rather flippantly) the great dangers facing the defenders during the incessant Spanish bombardment.

Discipline amongst the troops was harsh, and infractions such as drunkenness common. 'Our Men were put to allowance of a pint of Wine per Day, to prevent their frequent drunkenness.' 'S.H.' also blamed the failure of the sortie on 28 April (NS) on the drunkenness of the gunners. Although deserters from the Spanish force were welcomed warmly, attempts at desertion by British soldiers were dealt with harshly. After the siege a Cameronian was caught trying to escape to the Spanish lines:

Life was also hard for the civilian population. The 400 Spaniards in Gibraltar had been expelled at the beginning of the siege, leaving around 200 adult male Genoese and 100 adult male Jews to help with the defence. 'S.H.' recorded that 'A body of the Jews desire leave to retire to Barbary, because commanded to work for the common Preservation, but answer'd by the Governor that as they had enjoy'd safe and plenty during Peace, if they will not assist for their own safety, they shall be turned over to the Spaniard.' However, another diarist of the siege indicated that the Gibraltarian Jews earned their salt as much as anyone else:

Punishments for non-combatants could also be harsh. Female transgressors of the correct codes were forced to endure the 'whirligig'.

This is far more gruesome than 'S.H.' makes clear, for whilst he tactfully wrote that it made the victim a little 'giddy' and 'land sick', George Hills has bluntly noted that 'In fact the centrifugal action caused the victim to empty through every orifice.' Another contemporary source recounted the gruesome way in which two Moorish spies were displayed after their execution:

See also
 Great Siege of Gibraltar
 History of Gibraltar

References

Primary sources
 S.H. (Anon.), Journal of the Siege of Gibraltar (Gibraltar Museum Manuscripts: 1728)

Secondary sources
 Browning, Reed. The Duke of Newcastle. Yale University Press, 1975.
 Fernández Duro, Cesáreo. Armada española desde la unión de los reinos de Castilla y de León, tomo VI. Sucesores de Rivadeneyra, 1902.
 
 
 Hills, George: The Rock of Contention: A History of Gibraltar (London: Robert Hale and Company, 1974).
 Jackson, Sir William G. F.: The Rock of the Gibraltarians: A History of Gibraltar (Gibraltar: Gibraltar Books Ltd., 2001)
 Kenyon, E. R., Gibraltar under Moor, Spaniard and Briton (London: Methuen and Co. Ltd., 1938).
 Ledesma Miranda, Ramón: Gibraltar, la Roca de Calpe, Ediciones del Movimiento, 1957
 Sayer, Frederick: The history of Gibraltar and of its political relation to events in Europe... Saunders, Otley & Co., 1862
 Simms, Brendan. Three Victories and a Defeat: The Rise and Fall of the First British Empire. Penguin Books, 2008.
 Solas Dodd, James: The ancient and modern history of Gibraltar. With an accurate journal of the siege of that fortress, Feb. 13 to June 23, 1727. Tr. from the Spanish, 1781
 Maria Montero, Francisco: Historia de Gibraltar y de su campo, Imprenta de la Revista Médica, 1860
 Maria Monti, Ángel: Historia de Gibraltar: dedicada a SS. AA. RR., los serenisimos señores Infantes Duques de Montpensier, Imp. Juan Moyano, 1852

Sieges involving Great Britain
Sieges involving Spain
1727 in Gibraltar
Sieges of Gibraltar
Conflicts in 1727
Anglo-Spanish War (1727–1729)